Dongshan District is a rural district in Tainan, Taiwan. It was formerly called Hoansia.

History 
During the Dutch era, the place was known as Dorko, and existed as a township called To-lo-koh in the early 20th century.

After the handover of Taiwan from Japan to the Republic of China in 1945, Dongshan was organized as a rural township of Tainan County. On 25 December 2010, Tainan County merged with Tainan City and Dongshan was upgraded to a district of the city.

Administrative divisions 
Tungshan, Tungzhong, Tungzheng, Dake, Sanrong, Keli, Tunghe, Shengxian, Nanxi, Shuiyun, Linan, Tungyuan, Lingnan, Nanshi, Jingshan and Gaoyuan Village.

Economy 
Dongshan is famous for its coffee crop.

Tourist attractions 
 Dongshan Bisuan Temple
 Dongshan Sports Park
 Senwho Holiday Farm
 Shueiyun Village
 Sikou Little Switzerland
 Siraya National Scenic Area

Notable natives
 Su Yu-chang, martial artist, scholar and practitioner of traditional Chinese medicine

References 

Districts of Tainan